Neosporidesmium xanthophylli is a species of anamorphic ascomycete fungi, first found in tropical forests in Hainan, China, specifically in dead branches of Xanthophyllum hainanense, hence its name.

References

Further reading
Li, Xiang-Yu, Shu-Yan Liu, and Xiu-Guo Zhang. "A new species of Neosporidesmium from Hainan, China." Mycotaxon 130.2 (2015): 307–310.
Prasher, Indu B., and Rajnish K. Verma. "Neosporidesmium appendiculatus sp. nov. from North–Western India." Mycological Progress 14.10 (2015): 1–6.

External links

MycoBank

Ascomycota